In operator algebras, the enveloping von Neumann algebra of a C*-algebra is a von Neumann algebra that contains all the operator-algebraic information about the given C*-algebra. This may also be called the universal enveloping von Neumann algebra, since it is given by a universal property; and (as always with von Neumann algebras) the term W*-algebra may be used in place of von Neumann algebra.

Definition 

Let A be a C*-algebra and πU be its universal representation, acting on Hilbert space HU. The image of πU, πU(A), is a C*-subalgebra of bounded operators on HU. The enveloping von Neumann algebra of A is the closure of πU(A) in the weak operator topology. It is sometimes denoted by A′′.

Properties 

The universal representation πU and A′′ satisfies the following universal property: for any representation π, there is a unique *-homomorphism

 
that is continuous in the weak operator topology and the restriction of Φ to πU(A) is π.

As a particular case, one can consider the continuous functional calculus, whose unique extension gives a canonical Borel functional calculus.
 
By the Sherman–Takeda theorem, the double dual of a C*-algebra A, A**, can be identified with A′′, as Banach spaces.

Every representation of A uniquely determines a central projection (i.e. a projection in the center of the algebra) in A′′; it is called the central cover of that projection.

See also
 Universal enveloping algebra

C*-algebras